SBOA School and Junior College was founded by Shri E. A. G. Moses and is operated by the SBIOA Education Trust, run by the State Bank of India Officers Association in Anna Nagar Western Extension, Chennai, Tamil Nadu, India. The school educates students from Kindergarten up to Standard 12, which is the final year of schooling in the state.

History
SBOA School and Junior College at Anna Nagar West was started in 1979.  The school was founded by the SBIOA Educational Trust formed by the State Bank of India Officers' Association (Chennai Circle), then headed by its general secretary, Shri E. A. G. Moses. The purpose of starting the School was to let the children of the Officers of State Bank of India continue their education when they got transferred. Many of them found it extremely difficult to get admission in any of the other Schools in the city. The School was started with 13 teachers and the roofs of the class rooms initially were thatched. Shri E. A. G. Moses contributed Rs.8/- initially and contributions from other Officers followed. Many fund raising events were also held by the physical education department headed by Mr Easwaharan to raise funds for construction of the buildings and get other infrastructures required for the School.  The educational trust slowly expanded by opening Schools in Madurai, Coimbatore, Tiruchirapalli and Ernakulam. Its foundation was timed to coincide with the International Year of the Child - 1979. Shirley Ray served as the first principal of this school.

The SBIOA Educational Trust runs other schools in the south Indian states of Kerala and Tamil Nadu.

See also
 SBOA Matriculation and Higher Secondary School, Chennai
 S.B.O.A. Matric. & Hr. Sec. School, Coimbatore

References

External links

Primary schools in Tamil Nadu
High schools and secondary schools in Chennai
1979 establishments in Tamil Nadu
Educational institutions established in 1979
Private schools in Tamil Nadu
State Bank of India